Derek Taylor was a British journalist and press officer for The Beatles.

Derek Taylor may also refer to:

Derek Taylor (cricketer) (born 1942), former English cricketer
Derek Taylor (EastEnders)
Derek Hugh Taylor (born 1951), Chief Minister of the Turks and Caicos Islands, 1995–2003

Fictional characters
Derek Taylor, a character in the American TV sitcom Silver Spoons